Christian Borromeo is a retired Italian actor. He made several feature films, perhaps best known for Ruggero Deodato's The House on the Edge of the Park, and Dario Argento's Tenebrae.

Career 

Borromeo began his career with a part in the Italian film Lezioni di violoncello con toccata e fuga in 1976.

Then he went on to star as 'Germano' in the 1979 erotic comedy Ups and Downs of a Super Stud (Pensione Amore Servizio Completo) directed by Luigi Russo.

In 1980, he starred in Ruggero Deodato's ensemble-thriller The House on the Edge of the Park, and in 1982 he also played a brief, but major supporting part in Dario Argento's giallo-slasher Tenebrae, and the same year also managed to play the part of 'Lotario' in Ehrengard by director Emidio Greco.

He effectively ended his acting career in 1997, with his last movie-appearance in the TV-movie Inquietudine.

Selected filmography 

 Lezioni di violoncello con toccata e fuga (1976) - Stefano
 Quella strana voglia d'amara (1977) - Marco
 Nest of Vipers (1978) - Renato Richter
  The Pleasure Shop on 7th Avenue (1979) - Frank
  (1979) - Germano
 Stigma (1980) - Sebastian
 The House on the Edge of the Park (1980) - Tom
 Tranquille donne di campagna (1980) - Alberto
 Tenebrae (1982) - Gianni
 Ehrengard (1982) - Lotario
 Murder Rock (1984) - Willy Stark
 Senza Vergogna (1986) - Andrea De Marchi
 Intervista (1987) - Christian
 28 minuto (1991) - Fabrizio

References

External links
 

1957 births
Italian male film actors
Living people